The team event competition of the PyeongChang 2018 Olympics was held on 24 February 2018 at the Yongpyong Alpine Centre in PyeongChang.

Rules
This was a parallel slalom competition. There were four members on each team (two males and two females), as well as two reserves. There were four races and the winner of each race scored a point for their team (a tied race awards one point per team). The first race was female against female, race two was male against male, race three was female against female and the last race was male against male. If, after four races, both teams had the same number of points, then the race times of each team's fastest man and woman would be added and the team with the best aggregate time won. If there were two non finishes in the same race, whoever progressed further would win the race.

Qualified teams

Teams and participating athletes:

Stephanie Brunner
Katharina Gallhuber
Katharina Liensberger
Manuel Feller
Michael Matt
Marco Schwarz

Candace Crawford
Erin Mielzynski
Laurence St. Germain
Phil Brown
Trevor Philp
Erik Read

Gabriela Capová
Martina Dubovská
Kateřina Pauláthová
Ondřej Berndt
Filip Forejtek
Jan Zabystřan

Adeline Baud Mugnier
Nastasia Noens
Tessa Worley
Julien Lizeroux
Clément Noël
Alexis Pinturault

Lena Dürr
Marina Wallner
Fritz Dopfer
Alexander Schmid
Linus Straßer

Charlotte Guest
Alexandra Tilley
Dave Ryding
Laurie Taylor

Szonja Hozmann
Mariann Mimi Maróty
Márton Kékesi
Dalibor Šamšal

Federica Brignone
Chiara Costazza
Irene Curtoni
Stefano Gross
Riccardo Tonetti
Alex Vinatzer

Nina Haver-Løseth
Kristin Lysdahl
Maren Skjøld
Sebastian Foss-Solevåg
Leif Kristian Nestvold-Haugen
Jonathan Nordbotten

Anastasiia Silanteva
Ekaterina Tkachenko
Aleksandr Khoroshilov
Ivan Kuznetsov

Soňa Moravčíková
Veronika Velez-Zuzulová
Petra Vlhová
Matej Falat
Adam Žampa
Andreas Žampa

Ana Bucik
Maruša Ferk
Tina Robnik
Štefan Hadalin
Žan Kranjec

Gim So-hui
Kang Young-seo
Jung Dong-hyun
Kim Dong-woo

Frida Hansdotter
Anna Swenn-Larsson
Emelie Wikström
Mattias Hargin
Kristoffer Jakobsen
André Myhrer

Denise Feierabend
Wendy Holdener
Luca Aerni
Daniel Yule
Ramon Zenhäusern

Patricia Mangan
Megan McJames
Alice Merryweather
David Chodounsky
Mark Engel
Nolan Kasper

FIS Overall Nations Cup standings
The participating nations were seeded according to the Overall Nations Cup standings prior to the 2018 Winter Olympics.

Results
The race was started at 11:00.

Bracket

 Notes
 Teams marked with asterisks won by faster cumulated time of the best male and the best female skier.

References

Mixed team
Mixed events at the 2018 Winter Olympics